The 1984 Washington gubernatorial election was held on November 6, 1984. Incumbent Republican John Spellman ran for re-election to a second term, but despite Ronald Reagan's landslide re-election was defeated by Democrat Booth Gardner.

Blanket primary

Candidates

Democratic
Booth Gardner, Pierce County Executive
Jim McDermott, psychiatrist, state senator, candidate for governor in 1972, and nominee for governor 1980
John Jovanovich, state representative

Republican
John Spellman, incumbent Governor of Washington
Ted Parker Fix

Third-party
Mark A. Calney (Independent), author
Bob LeRoy (Populist)
Cheryll Y. Hidalgo (Socialist Workers)

Results

General election

Candidates
John Spellman (R), incumbent Governor of Washington
Booth Gardner (D), Pierce County Executive

Results

References

1984
1984 United States gubernatorial elections
Gubernatorial